Patricio Anibal Letelier Sotomayor (September 11, 1943 – June 9, 2011) was a Chilean mathematical physicist and professor at University of Campinas (UNICAMP).

Work 

Letelier was born in Santiago. Early in his career (1993) Letelier worked with Dmitrii Vladimirovich Gal'tsov to define what has become known as The Letelier-Gal'tsov spacetime. He received his Ph.D. in Physics from the Boston University in 1977 under John Stachel. He joined the faculty of the University of Brasilia until 1988 when became a Professor of Mathematical Physics in the Department of Applied Mathematics of UNICAMP.

His last published work is a study of the three-body problem with Tiago Amancio da Silva. See also the Tom Banks' paper "A Critique of Pure String Theory: Heterodox Opinions of Diverse Dimensions." published in 2003.

He died on Thursday, June 9, 2011 of a cardiac arrest in his home in Campinas.

In honor of  his work, an astronomer he advised for a doctor thesis, named an asteroid he had discovered after Letelier: (109879) Letelier.

External links 
Patricio Letelier's profile at inSpire with publications, co-authors, and citations
Isaac Newton Institute for Mathematical Sciences, Cambridge UK 1994
Spinning Strings, Black Holes and Stable Closed Timelike Geodesics
Relativistic ring models
Patricio A.S. Letelier's Mathematics Genealogy

References 

1943 births
2011 deaths
Chilean physicists
Chilean expatriates in Brazil
Academic staff of the State University of Campinas